Empress Yu may refer to:

Yu Wenjun (297–328), empress of the Jin dynasty, wife of Sima Shao (Emperor Ming)
Yu Daolian (died 366), empress of the Jin dynasty, wife of Sima Yi (Emperor Fei)
Empress Yu (Northern Wei) (488?–507), empress of the Northern Wei dynasty

See also
 Queen Yu (disambiguation)

Yu